Meikayla Jean-Maree Moore (born 4 June 1996) is a professional footballer who plays as a defender for Glasgow City in the Scottish Women's Premier League and the New Zealand national team.

Career
Moore was a member of the New Zealand U-17 side at the 2012 Women's World Championship, playing in all three of New Zealand's group games.

Moore made her senior début for the Football Ferns as a substitute in a 4–0 win over China on 26 September 2013.

She was part of New Zealand's squad at the 2015 FIFA Women's World Cup in Canada.

In April 2019, Moore was named to the final 23-player squad for the 2019 FIFA Women's World Cup, however while in France training before the tournament started, Moore snapped her Achilles.

15 months later she had recovered enough from the injury to sign for Liverpool who play in the FA Women's Championship.

On 20 February 2022, Moore scored a perfect hat-trick of own goals in a match for New Zealand against the United States at the SheBelieves Cup, all in the first half; Moore is the second footballer believed to have recorded a hat-trick of own goals which were not deliberate, after Stan van den Buys.

International goals

Notes

References

External links

 Profile at NZF
 

1996 births
Living people
1. FC Köln (women) players
MSV Duisburg (women) players
Liverpool F.C. Women players
New Zealand women's international footballers
New Zealand women's association footballers
New Zealand expatriate sportspeople in Germany
2015 FIFA Women's World Cup players
Association footballers from Christchurch
Footballers at the 2016 Summer Olympics
Olympic association footballers of New Zealand
Women's association football defenders
Footballers at the 2020 Summer Olympics
New Zealand expatriate women's association footballers
Expatriate women's footballers in Scotland
New Zealand expatriate sportspeople in Scotland
New Zealand expatriate sportspeople in England
Expatriate women's footballers in England
Expatriate women's footballers in Germany
Glasgow City F.C. players
Frauen-Bundesliga players
Scottish Women's Premier League players